How Did This Get Made? (HDTGM) is a podcast on the Earwolf network. It is hosted by Paul Scheer, June Diane Raphael and Jason Mantzoukas with occasional substitutes and/or guest hosts. Each episode features the deconstruction and mockery of outlandish and bad films.

Format
The hosts and guest make jokes about the films as well as attempt to unscramble plots. After discussing the film, Scheer reads "second opinions" in the form of five-star reviews posted online by Amazon.com users. The hosts also often make recommendations on if the film is worth watching. The show is released every two weeks.

During the show's off week a ".5" episode (also known as a "minisode") is uploaded. These episodes feature Scheer's "explanation hopeline" where he answers questions from fans who call in, the movie for the next week is announced, Scheer reads corrections and omissions from the message board regarding last week's episode, and he opens fan mail and provides his recommendations on books, movies, TV shows etc. that he is enjoying.

Some full episodes are recorded in front of a live audience and include a question and answer session and original "second opinion" theme songs sung by fans. Not all content from the live shows is included in the final released episode - about 30 minutes of each live show is edited out.

History
The podcast started in 2010 and by 2019 had released over 200 episodes. How Did This Get Made? began after Scheer and Raphael saw the movie Wall Street: Money Never Sleeps. Later, the pair talked to Mantzoukas about the movie and joked about the idea for starting a bad movie podcast. , Wall Street: Money Never Sleeps has never been covered on the podcast.

Awards
In 2019, How Did This Get Made? won a Webby Award in the category of Podcasts – Television & Film.

In 2020 and 2022, How Did This Get Made? won an iHeartRadio award in the category of Best TV & Film Podcast.

In 2022, How Did This Get Made? won an Ambie award in the category of Best Comedy Podcast.

Spinoffs

How Did This Get Made?: Origin Stories
Between February and September 2017, a 17-episode spin-off series of the podcast was released. Entitled How Did This Get Made?: Origin Stories, author Blake J. Harris would interview people involved with the movies discussed on the podcast. Guests on the show included director Mel Brooks, who served as executive producer on Solarbabies, and screenwriter Dan Gordon, who wrote Surf Ninjas.

Unspooled
In May 2018, Scheer began a new podcast with Amy Nicholson titled Unspooled that is also devoted to movies. Unlike HDTGM?, however, Unspooled looks at films deemed good enough for the updated 2007 edition of the AFI Top 100. This is often referenced in How Did This Get Made? by Mantzoukas and Raphael, who are comically annoyed at how they were not invited to host the podcast, instead being subjected to the bad films that HDTGM covers.

How Did This Get Played?
In June 2019, the Earwolf network launched the podcast How Did This Get Played?, hosted by Doughboys host Nick Wiger and former Saturday Night Live writer Heather Anne Campbell. The podcast was positioned as the video game equivalent of HDTGM?, where Wiger and Campbell review widely panned video games. The podcast was later changed to Get Played, focusing on multiple aspects of video games and deviating from the original format.

French adaptation
The program was adapted in France in 2014 under the title 2 heures de perdues ("2 hours wasted"), a podcast in which several friends meet to analyze bad films in the same style ― mainly focusing on American, French, and British films. The show then ends with a reading of comments found on AlloCiné, the biggest French-speaking cinema website, or from Amazon.

Danish adaptation
The program was adapted in Denmark in 2014 under the title Dårligdommerne ("The bad judges"), a podcast in which the hosts Jacob Hinchely, Troels Møller and Christopher “sideburns” Andersen meet to analyze bad films in the same style ― mainly focusing on Danish films.

Episodes

See also 

 List of film and television podcasts
 The Disaster Artist

References

External links 
 
 How Did This Get Made on Earwolf

Audio podcasts
Earwolf
Film and television podcasts
Comedy and humor podcasts
2010 podcast debuts